The 2013/14 FIS Nordic Combined World Cup was the 31st World Cup season, a combination of ski jumping and cross-country skiing organized by FIS. It will start on 30 November 2013 in Kuusamo, Finland and will end on 16 March 2014 in Falun, Sweden.

Calendar

Men

Team

Standings

Overall 

Standings after 17 events.

Nations Cup 

Standings after 22 events.

Achievements
First World Cup podium
, 29, in his 11th season – no. 3 in the WC 3 in Kuusamo
, 25, in his 8th season – no. 3 in the WC 14 in Almaty

Victory in this World Cup (in brackets victory for all time)
 , 4 (7) first places
 , 3 (21) first places
 , 2 (22) first places
 , 1 (16) first places
 , 1 (6) first places
 , 1 (5) first places
 , 1 (4) first places
 , 1 (3) first places

References

External links
FIS Nordic Combined World Cup 2013/2014 

2013 in Nordic combined
2014 in Nordic combined
2013–14
Qualification events for the 2014 Winter Olympics